The 2020 NCAA Division III men's basketball tournament was a single-elimination tournament to determine the national champion of men's NCAA Division III college basketball in the United States. Featuring sixty-four teams, it began on March 6, 2020, following the 2019–20 season, and was to conclude with the championship game on April 5, 2020.

The national quarterfinal and semifinal rounds were to be held at the Allen County War Memorial Coliseum in Fort Wayne, Indiana, the site of the 2019 tournament finals, while the championship game was to be played at State Farm Arena in Atlanta, Georgia, coinciding with the Division I Final Four.

As a result of the ongoing COVID-19 pandemic, Johns Hopkins University announced that it had chosen not to admit spectators to the first and second-round games hosted there. On March 12, the NCAA announced that the remaining games of the tournament were cancelled due to the coronavirus pandemic.

Sixteen teams had advanced to the third round at the time the tournament was called off.

Qualifying teams

Automatic bids (43)
The following 43 teams were automatic qualifiers for the 2020 NCAA field by virtue of winning their conference's automatic bid (except for the UAA, whose regular-season champion received the automatic bid).

At-large bids (21)

The following 21 teams were awarded qualification for the tournament field by the NCAA Division III Men's Basketball Committee. The committee evaluated teams on the basis of their win–loss percentage, strength of schedule, head-to-head results, results against common opponents, and results against teams included in the NCAA's final regional rankings. By rule, one bid is reserved for teams in Pool B, which are unaffiliated or whose conference does not yet qualify for an automatic bid (e.g. the Atlantic East Conference).

Tournament bracket

* – Denotes overtime period

Top-left

Bottom-left

Top-right

Bottom-right

Final Four
Those rounds were cancelled.

See also
2020 NCAA Division III women's basketball tournament
2020 NCAA Division I men's basketball tournament
2020 NCAA Division II men's basketball tournament
2020 NAIA Division I men's basketball tournament
2020 NAIA Division II men's basketball tournament

References

NCAA Division III men's basketball tournament
Ncaa Tournament
NCAA Division III Men's Basketball
College basketball tournaments in Georgia (U.S. state)
Basketball competitions in Atlanta
NCAA Division III men's basketball tournament, 2020